The Robinhood Free Meetinghouse is a historic church building at 210 Robinhood Road in Georgetown, Maine.  Built in 1856, it is a modest example of vernacular Greek Revival architecture, distinctive as one of Maine's few rural 19th-century churches to have its sanctuary space on the second floor.  The building was listed on the National Register of Historic Places in 2016; it has recently been converted for use as a restaurant.

Description and history
The former Robinhood Free Meetinghouse stands in a rural area in the northern part of the island community of Georgetown, at the junction of Robinhood and Webber Roads.  It is a two-story wood frame structure, with a gabled roof and clapboarded exterior.  The front facade is symmetrical, with two entrances flanking a square multipane window in the center, above which is a sash window.  The building corners have paneled pilasters rising to an entablature and a fully pedimented cornice.  An open deck with balustrade extends most of the way across the front and beyond the left corner.  The first floor interior originally consisted of three small chambers across the front, and a larger open chamber to the rear, which was used as a classroom.  The main sanctuary is on the second floor, with original pews and other 19th-century features.

The church was built in 1856, to house Methodist and Congregationalist church groups.  The downstairs area served as a vestry meeting space and classroom for religious instruction.  The church was designed by Moses Riggs, member of the locally prominent Riggs family, and was built on land given by Herbert Low and Francis Low, Jr.  The Congregationalists ceased use of the church in 1864, while the Methodist congregation continued to use it for another century.  It has since passed into private ownership, and has recently been adapted for use as a restaurant.

See also
National Register of Historic Places listings in Sagadahoc County, Maine

References

Georgetown, Maine
Churches in Sagadahoc County, Maine
Churches on the National Register of Historic Places in Maine
Greek Revival church buildings in Maine
Churches completed in 1856
19th-century churches in the United States
Former churches in Maine
1856 establishments in Maine
National Register of Historic Places in Sagadahoc County, Maine
Congregational churches in Maine